The Scrantons are a family prominent in the business and political history of Pennsylvania: 

George Whitfield Scranton (1811–1861), United States Congressman, 1859–1861.
Joseph A. Scranton (1838–1908), United States Congressman, 1881–1887, 1889–1891 and 1893–1897.
William Walker Scranton (1844–1916), president and manager of the Lackawanna Iron and Coal Company.
Worthington Scranton (1876–1955), president, Scranton Gas and Water Company.
Marion Margery Scranton (1884–1960), Pennsylvania Republican Committee Member, 1922–1934; Republican National Committee Member, 1928–1940; Vice Chair of the Republican National Committee, 1937; delegate to the Republican National Convention, 1940, 1944, 1948. Granddaughter-in-law of Joseph A. Scranton.
William Warren Scranton (1917–2013), Governor of Pennsylvania, 1963-1967; United States Ambassador to the United Nations, 1976–1977; candidate for Republican nomination for President of the United States, 1964. Grandson of William Walker Scranton.
William Scranton III (born 1947) lieutenant governor of Pennsylvania, 1979–1987; candidate for Governor of Pennsylvania, 1986; candidate for Republican nomination for Governor of Pennsylvania, 2006. Son of William Warren Scranton.

See also
List of United States political families
Scranton Area Community Foundation

Gallery
Images of Scranton family members:

Images of the estate of Worthington and Marion Margery Scranton, Hobe Sound, Florida, 1942:

References

Families from Pennsylvania
Political families of the United States